Luminespib (INN, previously known as NVP-AUY922) is an experimental drug candidate for the treatment of cancer. It was discovered through a collaboration between The Institute of Cancer Research and the pharmaceutical company Vernalis and licensed to Novartis.  From 2011 to 2014 it was in Phase II clinical trials.  Chemically it is a resorcinylic isoxazole amide

Luminespib is an inhibitor of heat shock protein 90 (Hsp90), which is a chaperone protein that plays a role in the modification of a variety of proteins that have been implicated in oncogenesis. Luminespib has shown promising activity in preclinical testing against several different tumor types.

A related compound, NVP-HSP990, was abandoned by Novartis in 2012 after it failed to show efficacy in an early clinical trial.

See also
 Hsp90 inhibitors

References

Carboxamides
Experimental cancer drugs
Isoxazoles
4-Morpholinyl compunds
Resorcinols